Rannick Schoop (born 25 September 1996) is a Curaçoan professional footballer who plays as a right back for ONS Sneek.

Career
In January 2019, Schoop returned to SC Heerenveen, signing for the reserve team of the club. In the summer, he then joined ONS Sneek.

References

External links
 
 

1996 births
Living people
Curaçao footballers
SC Heerenveen players
De Graafschap players
Eredivisie players
Eerste Divisie players
Association football defenders
Curaçao expatriate footballers
Curaçao expatriate sportspeople in the Netherlands
Expatriate footballers in the Netherlands
ONS Sneek players